Eirini-Marina Alexandri (born 15 September 1997) is an Austrian synchronized swimmer. She competed in the women's duet at the 2016 Summer Olympics, and 2020 Olympics. She is a triplet and teams with her sisters, Anna-Maria and Vasiliki Alexandri.
The three sisters grow up in Volos, and moved in Austria in 2015, after an argument with Greek Swimming Federation.

References

1997 births
Living people
Austrian synchronized swimmers
Austrian people of Greek descent
Greek synchronized swimmers
Olympic synchronized swimmers of Austria
Naturalised citizens of Austria
European Games medalists in synchronised swimming
Synchronised swimmers at the 2015 European Games
Synchronized swimmers at the 2016 Summer Olympics
Synchronized swimmers at the 2020 Summer Olympics
Swimmers from Volos
Synchronized swimmers at the 2017 World Aquatics Championships
European Games silver medalists for Austria
Artistic swimmers at the 2019 World Aquatics Championships
Greek emigrants to Austria
Artistic swimmers at the 2022 World Aquatics Championships
World Aquatics Championships medalists in synchronised swimming
20th-century Austrian women
21st-century Austrian women
European Aquatics Championships medalists in synchronised swimming
Triplets
Greek twins
Twin sportspeople